Henry Lewis Wright (December 16, 1906 – August 27, 1960), nicknamed "Red", was an American Negro league pitcher between 1929 and 1935.

A native of Columbia, Tennessee, Wright made his Negro leagues debut in 1929 for the Nashville Elite Giants. He played for the team through 1935, as the franchise moved from Nashville to Cleveland and Columbus.

References

External links
 and Baseball-Reference Black Baseball stats and Seamheads

1906 births
1960 deaths
Cleveland Cubs players
Columbus Elite Giants players
Nashville Elite Giants players
Baseball pitchers
Baseball players from Tennessee
People from Columbia, Tennessee